List of BMX bicycles is a list of former and current manufacturers of BMX bicycles.

BMX bicycles

A

C
 
Colony BMX – Australian BMX Bicycle manufacturer
Cortina Cycles is a bicycle frame manufacturer in Santa Barbara, California
CW Racing BMX manufacturer in Orange, California
CYC Stormer BMX bike

D
Devlin Custom Cycles - Australian BMX Bicycle manufacturer
Diamondback was founded as a BMX brand in 1977 by Western States Imports in Newbury Park, California, which sold bikes under the Centurion (bicycle) brand. Became a highly regarded name in BMX.

DYNO is a BMX bike and bike products company started by Bob Morales in 1982.

E
Ellsworth Handcrafted Bicycles is a bicycle manufacturer based in San Diego, CA. Founded by Tony Ellsworth in 1991.

F
Floval Flyer Aluminum frame BMX bike with The 24' wheels, made by SE Racing.

G
GHP BMX Frame, fork, bars and seat post manufacturer
GT Bicycles a freestyle BMX bike with pegs.

H
Haro named for Bob Haro it was a freestyle BMX bike with pegs.

J
JMC BMX Chrome Moly BMX frame and forks

K
Kuwahara BMX chrome frame with red wheels.

L
Laguna BMX bike

M

Murray In 1977, again following a youth trend, Murray introduced its BMX model.

N
Next (bicycle company) is an American bicycle brand distributed by Dynacraft BSC.

P
Patterson Racing - chrome molly BMX frames and forks.
PK Ripper introduced in 1979 and still in production.

R
Race Inc. BMX bicycle frame manufacturer
Redline Bicycles is an American company offering BMX, freestyle, cyclocross, mountain (MTB), and road bicycles
Robinson Pro BMX bike company started by Chuck Robinson.

S
Schwinn introduced the Scrambler in 1975
Skyway BMX frame and fork manufacturer
SE Racing named for Scot Breithaupt (Scot Enterprises) they manufactured the PK Ripper

T
Torker Started in 1977 manufacturing a BMX bike frame. The first Haro bikes were made by Torker.

W
West Coast Cycle produced the brand Cyclepro BMX

See also

List of bicycle brands and manufacturing companies

References

BMX manufacturers
Manufacturers
Lists of brands
Cycling-related lists
BMX
Lists of manufacturers
Transport lists